A longsword is a type of European two-handed sword.

Longsword may also refer to:

People
William Longsword (893–942), the second ruler of Normandy
William of Winchester, Lord of Lunenburg (1184–1213), or William Longsword
William Longespée, 3rd Earl of Salisbury (1176–1226) ("Long Sword")

Other uses
Long Sword dance, an English hilt-and-point sword dance
Longsword (novel), a 1762 work by the Irish writer Thomas Leland